Moy Pocket is a rural locality in the Gympie Region, Queensland, Australia.

References 

Gympie Region
Localities in Queensland